McMillon is a surname. Notable people with the surname include:

Billy McMillon (born 1971), American baseball player
Bobby McMillon (born 1951), American musician
Doug McMillon (born 1966), American chief executive
Joi McMillon, American film editor
Shellie McMillon (1936–1980), American basketball player
Todd McMillon (born 1974), American football player